The following is a list of Sites of Special Scientific Interest in the Rum and the Small Isles Area of Search.  For other areas, see List of SSSIs by Area of Search.

 Camus Mor, Muck
 Canna and Sanday
 Eigg - An Sgurr and Gleann Charadail
 Eigg - Cleadale
 Eigg - Laig to Kildonnan
 Rum

 
Rum and the Small Isles